The 1861 Suburbs of Nelson by-election was a by-election held  on 20 June 1861 in the  electorate during the 3rd New Zealand Parliament.

The by-election was caused by the resignation of the incumbent, James Wemyss, who was travelling overseas and did not want the electorate unrepresented

He was replaced by William Wells.

Wells was the only nomination, so was declared elected unopposed.

References 

Nelson Suburbs 1861
1861 elections in New Zealand
June 1861 events
Politics of Taranaki